Twist of Fate is a song written by Lasse "Yogi" Anderson and Emilia Rydberg, and recorded by Emilia Rydberg on her 1998 album Big Big World.

Track listing
CD-single (Rodeo UMD-87221 (UMG) / EAN 0602508722127)
Twist of Fate (ballad version) – 3.44
Twist of Fate (navigatorremix, radio edit) – 3.24

Maxisingle (Universal)
Twist of Fate (K-Klass Radio Mix) - 3:43
Twist of Fate (Album Version) - 3:02
Twist of Fate (Pierre J's Good 12") - 5:33
Twist of Fate (K-Klass Bunker Dub) - 6:24

Charts

References 

1998 songs
1999 singles
Emilia Rydberg songs
English-language Swedish songs
Songs written by Emilia Rydberg
Universal Music Group singles
Songs written by Lasse Anderson